HED (Harley Ellis Devereaux) is an architecture and engineering firm based in Southfield, Michigan with offices in Southfield, Chicago, Illinois, Los Angeles, Sacramento, California, San Diego, Dallas, Texas, Boston, Massachusetts and San Francisco, California.  The firm was founded in 1908 by architects Alvin E. Harley and Norman S. Atcheson.

Activities
HED is one of the 200 largest design firms in the United States, employing more than 400 professionals including architects; mechanical, electrical, and structural engineers; landscape architects; interior designers; graphics, signage, and equipment designers; and laboratory design specialists. The firm specializes in multiple practices including health care, science and technology, corporate and commercial, mixed-use and residential, Pre K-12 schools, higher education, civic and cultural, mission critical, industrial and automotive and manufacturing and product development.

HED buildings 

 Horace Rackham Education Memorial Building, Detroit, 1941.
 City-County Building Coleman A. Young Municipal Center, Detroit, 1950 
 U.S. State Department Building, Washington, D.C., 1960
 Union Bank Office Tower, San Jose, California, 1976
Wharton Center for Performing Arts, Michigan State University, East Lansing, Michigan, 1982
 University of Michigan Chemical Sciences Building, Ann Arbor, Michigan, 1988
 General Motors Truck Product Center, Pontiac, Michigan, 1996
 VA Medical Center, Ann Arbor, Michigan, 1998
 Wentworth Commons, Chicago, 2005
 Millennium Park Program Management, Chicago, 2006
 Hertzberg-Davis Forensic Science Center, Los Angeles, 2007
 USC Village, Los Angeles, 2017
 The Archdiocese of Detroit buildings, 1970.

Office locations 
 Southfield, Michigan
 Chicago, Illinois
 Los Angeles, California
 Sacramento, California
 San Diego, California
 San Francisco, California
Dallas, Texas
Boston, Massachusetts

History of firm names 

Since its inception in 1908, the firm has existed as:
 Harley and Atcheson (1908–1912)
 Alvin E. Harley, Architect (1912–1932)
 Harley and Ellington (1933–1942)
 Harley, Ellington and Day (1943–1960)
 Harley, Ellington, Cowin and Stirton (1961–1968)
 Harley Ellington Associates (1969–1972)
 Harley Ellington Pierce Yee Associates (1973–1994)
 Harley Ellington Design (1995–1999)
 HarleyEllis (2000–2005)
 HED (Harley Ellis Devereaux) (2006–Present)

Awards 

 Chicago’s 101 Best and Brightest Companies To Work For, 2005 - 2021 
 ZweigWhite, Hot Firm List, 2003, 2004, 2005, 2006, 2007
 Top Ten Green Projects, AIA COTE, West Branch of the Berkeley Public Library, 2016
 Top Ten Green Projects, AIA COTE, Lake View Terrace Library, 2004
 Metropolitan Detroit 101 Best and Brightest Companies To Work For, 2001 - 2021  
 AIA Michigan Firm of the Year, 2000

References

External links 
HED's website
Duggan, Daniel. (2008, February 18). "", Crain's Detroit Business, February 18, 2008.

Architecture firms based in Michigan
Engineering companies of the United States
Companies based in Southfield, Michigan
Design companies established in 1908
1908 establishments in Michigan
Architects from Detroit